The Roundtop Mountain Resort is a resort located in Pennsylvania. During the winter months the resort offers skiing, snowboarding, and snowtubing. During the spring, summer, and fall, Roundtop offers zip lines, a ropes course, OGO Balls, and year-round paintball.

Along with two other resorts, Whitetail Ski Resort and Liberty Mountain Resort, it was owned by Snow Time, Inc. Peak Resorts purchased the mountain in 2018 from Snow Time Inc., along with Snow Time's two other resorts, Whitetail Ski Resort and Liberty Mountain Resort. Vail bought and now operates them.

History
Roundtop Mountain Resort was originally developed under the name Ski Roundtop by Irvin Naylor in 1964. With other investors, Naylor formed Snow Time, Inc., to run the ski resort and leased the land to the corporation. Naylor's original stake in Snow Time, Inc. was 10 percent.  After a number of successful years, the corporation bought the land from him. Naylor then used the proceeds to increase his stake in Snow Time, Inc. to a 75 percent share.

In October 2018, Ski Roundtop and the other two Snow Time resorts Whitetail Ski Resort and Liberty Mountain Resort were bought by Peak Resorts and in July 2019, Ski Roundtop, Whitetail Ski Resort and Liberty Mountain Resort were purchased by Vail Resorts.

Statistics
Elevation: Base .
Summit: .
Uphill Capacity: 
Vertical Drop: 
Number of Trails: 22
Slope Difficulty: 29% Easier, 30% More Difficult, 31% Most Difficult, 10% Extremely Difficult
Lifts: 3 Quads, 2 Triples, 1 J-bar, 2 carpet lifts (and also 1 tubing carpet)
Night Skiing: 95% terrain, 7 nights a week
Snowmaking: 100%
Skiing Season: late-November to mid-March (weather dependent)

Trails
Roundtop Mountain Resort possesses slopes with varying levels of difficulty. The trail names are as follows:

 Easier Trails: Powderhorn, Drummer Boy, Fanny Hill, Discovery Area, Magic Mountain,   Fife and Drum,  J-Bar Park

 More Difficult Trails: Lower Lafayette's Leap, Minuteman, Susquehanna, Lower Exhibition,   Recruit

 Most Difficult Trails: Upper Lafayette's Leap, Barrett's Trail, Upper Exhibition, Patriot, Lower Ramrod, Lower Gunbarrel, Palisade Glades

 Extremely Difficult Trails: Upper Gunbarrel, Upper Ramrod

 Terrain Parks: Recruit, Fife & Drum, J-Bar Park, and Bunker Hill  

(Exhibition, Bunker Hill, Susquehanna, and Fanny Hill have also been designated as a terrain park/containing terrain park features in the past)

References

External links
Roundtop Mountain Resort website

Ski areas and resorts in Pennsylvania
Buildings and structures in York County, Pennsylvania
Tourist attractions in York County, Pennsylvania
Peak Resorts